Padgate railway station is a railway station in the Padgate area of the east of the town of Warrington, in North West England. The station, and all trains serving it, are operated by Northern Trains. It is 14 miles (23 km) west of Manchester Oxford Road on the southern route of the Liverpool to Manchester Line.

Facilities
The station is unstaffed, so passengers boarding at this station purchase their tickets from the ticket machines or from a train conductor. Waiting shelters and timetable posters are located on each platform and there is step-free access on both sides.

The station building is of typical Cheshire Lines Committee design and houses a fish and chip shop.

Services
There are no services from this station on Sundays.

References

External links

Railway stations in Warrington
DfT Category F2 stations
Former Cheshire Lines Committee stations
Railway stations in Great Britain opened in 1873
Northern franchise railway stations